Sierra Point is a point located in Yosemite National Park at the eastern end of the valley, below Grizzly Peak. The trail used to be quite popular, but was closed due to a rock slide in the 1970s. This was John Muir's  favorite trail. While a portion of the trail is still missing, it is still possible to reach the point. This hike should not be attempted by beginning hikers due to the difficulty of the missing portions of the trail. In fact, the National Park Service does not recommend that anyone take this trail. Despite this warning, many people still reach the point each year as it is easily accessible from the Vernal Fall trail in Happy Isles, and still has the original railing at the top. It is popular in part because it is the only point in the valley from which four waterfalls can be seen from one vantage point: Vernal Fall, Nevada Fall, Yosemite Falls, and Illilouette Fall.

External links 
 Old map showing the Sierra Point Trail
 Finding Yosemite's Sierra Point
 Images of the point and the trail
 Images of the point
 Images of the point
 Yosemite topo with the point labeled
 

Landforms of Yosemite National Park
Landforms of Mariposa County, California